David Hummell Greer (March 20, 1844 – May 19, 1919) was an American Protestant Episcopal bishop.

Biography

He was born in Wheeling, Virginia, (now West Virginia), graduated from Washington College (Pa.) in 1862, and studied at the Protestant Episcopal Seminary, Gambier, Ohio.  Ordained a priest in 1868, he was rector successively at Covington, Kentucky (1868–1871), Providence, Rhode Island (1871–1888), and New York City at St. Bartholomew's Church, 1888–1904.

In 1903, he was elected Bishop Coadjutor for the New York diocese and in 1908 succeeded Bishop Potter upon the latter's decease. He was replaced as rector of St. Bartholomew's Church by Dr. Leighton Parks.

Bishop Greer made himself known as an untiring personal worker in his parishes and his diocese, and as a believer in direct and unceremonious relationship between clergy and laymen. In 1914, Bishop Greer was appointed president of the Church Peace Union. 

Prior to 1917, Greer caused controversy by expressing opposition to US involvement in World War I. However, after the United States entered the war, Greer endorsed the war effort as a "great crusade against tyranny and aggression". 

On January 14, 1915, he officiated at the society wedding of a future bishop, the Rev. G. Ashton Oldham, to debutante Emily Pierrepont Gould at the Cathedral of St. John the Divine.

In 1869, Greer wed Caroline Augusta Keith, with whom he had three children. David and Caroline Greer died one month apart, in May and June 1919, respectively. Following his death, the Hope Farm School in Dutchess County, New York, was renamed "Greer School".

Publications
Moral Power of History (1890)
From Things to God (1893)
The Preacher and his Place (1895)
Visions (1898)

References

External links

Bibliographic directory from Project Canterbury

Other sources

Episcopal bishops of New York
Religious leaders from New York City
American religious writers
1844 births
1919 deaths
Washington & Jefferson College alumni
19th-century American Episcopalians